The big-eared kangaroo rat (Dipodomys elephantinus) is a kangaroo rat that lives in chaparral. It is named for and distinguished by its comparatively large ears.

Citations

Further reading
 

Dipodomys
Mammals described in 1919
Taxa named by Joseph Grinnell
Mammals of the United States